The 9th Commando Brigade is one of the 12 infantry brigades designated as commando in Turkish Land Forces. It's under the 9th Corps and is headquartered at Sarıkamış, Kars Province. Search and rescue training is given to soldiers in the brigade. Brigade was involved in Operation Olive Branch.

See also 

 List of commando units#Turkey

References 

Commando brigades of Turkey